Gladiolus orchidiflorus  is a Gladiolus species found in growing in clay and sandstone soil in the grasslands of Namaqualand, South Africa.

References

External links

orchidiflorus
Taxa named by Henry Cranke Andrews